The School District of New Berlin is a school district in New Berlin, Wisconsin, United States.

Schools
 Elmwood Elementary
 Orchard Lane Elementary
 Poplar Creek Elementary
 Ronald Reagan Elementary
 New Berlin Eisenhower Middle/High School
 New Berlin West High School

References

External links

School District of New Berlin

Education in Waukesha County, Wisconsin
School districts in Wisconsin